The Grand Canyon Antelopes softball team represents Grand Canyon University in NCAA Division I college softball. The team participates in the Western Athletic Conference. The Lopes are currently led by head coach Shanon Hays. The team plays its home games at GCU Softball Stadium located on the university's campus.

History
In 2002, GCU announced it would start a softball program that would compete in the 2004 season. On November 18, 2002, it announced the hiring of Arizona State assistant coach Ann Pedersen as its first head coach.

GCU qualified for the NCAA Tournament three times at the Division II level (2010, 2012, 2013).

The Lopes won the Western Athletic Conference regular-season championship in their first year (2014) at the Division I level. GCU also won the regular-season title in 2017.

GCU and Ann Pierson parted ways on May 20, 2021, after the program posted back-to-back losing seasons for the first time since 2008.

Shanon Hays was hired as the program's second head coach on June 11, 2021. In Hays' first season, he brought in 15 newcomers and led Grand Canyon to its third WAC regular-season title, first WAC Tournament title and first NCAA Tournament appearance.

Conference membership (Division I only)
2014–present: Western Athletic Conference

Head coaches (Division I only)
Ann Pierson was the head coach for 10 Division II seasons (2004-2013) not reflected below.

GCU Softball Stadium
GCU Softball Stadium is a softball stadium on the Grand Canyon campus in Phoenix, Arizona that seats 1,200 people. The new artificial turf playing surface was used in the 2017 season while a permanent stadium was built around it and opened on February 8, 2018.

GCU Softball Stadium replaced Stapleton-Pierson Stadium as the primary venue for the program.

Year-by-year NCAA Division I results

See also
List of NCAA Division I softball programs

References

External links
 GCULopes.com Softball

Softball
Western Athletic Conference softball